Oirat (Clear script: , , ; Kalmyk: , ; Khalkha Mongolian:) is a Mongolic language spoken by the descendants of Oirat Mongols, now forming parts of Mongols in China, Kalmyks in Russia and Mongolians. Largely mutually intelligible to other core Central Mongolic languages, scholars differ as to whether they regard Oirat as a distinct language or a major dialect of the Mongolian language. Oirat-speaking areas are scattered across the far west of Mongolia, the northwest of China and Russia's Caspian coast, where its major variety is Kalmyk. In China, it is spoken mainly in Xinjiang, but also among the Deed Mongol of Qinghai and Subei County in Gansu.

In all three countries, Oirat has become variously endangered or even obsolescent as a direct result of government actions or as a consequence of social and economic policies. Its most widespread tribal dialect, which is spoken in all of these nations, is Torgut. The term Oirat or more precisely, Written Oirat is sometimes also used to refer to the language of historical documents written in the Clear script.

Dialects 
In Mongolia, there are seven historical Oirat dialects, each corresponding to a different tribe:
Dörbet is spoken in half of the districts (sums) of Uvs Province and in Dörgön sum, Khovd Province
Bayat in the sums of Malchin, Khyargas, Tes and Züüngovi, Uvs
Torgut in Bulgan sum, Khovd
Altai Uriankhai in the sums of Duut and Mönkhkhairkhan, Khovd and in the sums of Altai, Buyant and Bulgan, Bayan-Ölgii Province
Ööld in Erdenebüren, Khovd
Zakhchin in the sums of Mankhan, Altai, Üyench, Zereg and Möst, Khovd
Khoton in Tarialan, Uvs.

There are some varieties of Oirat that are difficult to classify. The Alasha dialect in Alxa League, Inner Mongolia, originally belonged to Oirat and has been classified as such by some because of its phonology. However, it has been classified by others as Mongolian proper because of its morphology. The Darkhad dialect in Mongolia's Khövsgöl Province has variously been classified as Oirat, Mongolian proper, or (less often) Buryat.

Endangered language 
Oirat is endangered in all areas where it is spoken. In Russia, the killing of a large fraction of the Kalmyk population and the destruction of their society as consequences of the Kalmyk deportations of 1943, along with the subsequent imposition among them of Russian as the sole official language have rendered the language obsolescent: it is almost exclusively the elderly who have a fluent command of Kalmyk. In China, while Oirat is still quite widely used in its traditional ranges and there are many monolingual speakers, a combination of government policies and social realities has created an environment deleterious to the use of this language: the Chinese authorities' adoption of Southern Mongolian as the normative Mongolian language, new educational policies which have led to the virtual elimination of Mongolian schools in Xinjiang (there were just two left as of 2009), policies aiming to curtail nomadism, and the limited occupational prospects in Chinese society for graduates of Mongolian schools. As for Mongolia, the predominance of Khalkha Mongolian is bringing about the Khalkhaization of all other varieties of Mongolian.

Script systems

Oirat has been written in two script systems: the Mongolian scripts and Cyrillic.

Historically, the Clear script, which originated from the Mongolian script, was used. It uses modified letters shapes e.g. to differentiate between different rounded vowels, and it uses a small stroke on the right to indicate vowel length. It was retained longest in China where it can still be found in an occasional journal article. However, in China, Buryat and Oirat are considered non-standard compared to Southern Mongolian and are therefore supposed to use the Mongolian script and Southern Mongolian grammar for writing. In practice the people use neither and resort to learning Mandarin Chinese and using hànzì to communicate with others in China.

In Kalmykia, a Cyrillic-based script system has been implemented. It is strictly phonemic, not representing epenthetic vowels, and thus doesn't show syllabification.

In Mongolia, Central Mongolian minority varieties have no status, so Oirats are supposed to use Mongolian Cyrillic which de facto only represents Khalkha Mongolian.

References

Citations

Sources 

 Birtalan, Ágnes (2003): Oirat. In: Janhunen (ed.) 2003: 210–228.
 Bitkeeva, Aisa (2006): Kalmyckij yazyk v sovremennom mire. Moskva: NAUKA.
 Bitkeeva, Aisa (2007): Ethnic Language Identity and the Present Day Oirad-Kalmyks. Altai Hakpo, 17: 139–154.
 Bläsing, Uwe (2003): Kalmuck. In: Janhunen (ed.) 2003: 229–247.
 Chuluunbaatar, Otgonbayar (2008): Einführung in die mongolischen Schriften. Hamburg: Buske.
 Coloo, Ž. (1988): BNMAU dah’ mongol helnii nutgiin ajalguuny tol’ bichig: oird ayalguu. Ulaanbaatar: ŠUA.
 Indjieva, Elena (2009): Oirat Tobi: Intonational structure of the Oirat language. University of Hawaii. Dissertation.
 Janhunen, Juha (ed.) (2003): The Mongolic languages. London: Routledge.
 Katoh T., Mano S., Munkhbat B., Tounai K., Oyungerel G., Chae G. T., Han H., Jia G. J., Tokunaga K., Munkhtuvshin N., Tamiya G., Inoko H.: Genetic features of Khoton Mongolians revealed by SNP analysis of the X chromosome. Molecular Life Science, School of Medicine, Tokai University, Bohseidai, Isehara, Kanagawa, 259–1193, Japan. [Gene. 12 Sep. 2005].
 Sanžeev, G. D. (1953): Sravnitel’naja grammatika mongol’skih jazykov. Moskva: Akademija nauk SSSR.
 Sečenbaγatur, Qasgerel, Tuyaγ-a, B. ǰirannige, U Ying ǰe (2005): Mongγul kelen-ü nutuγ-un ayalγun-u sinǰilel-ün uduridqal. Kökeqota: Öbür mongγul-un arad-un keblel-ün qoriy-a.
 Svantesson, Jan-Olof, Anna Tsendina, Anastasia Karlsson, Vivan Franzén (2005): The Phonology of Mongolian. New York: Oxford University Press.

External links 

 ELAR archive of Documenting Henan Oirat, China

Agglutinative languages
Languages of Mongolia
Languages of China
Languages of Russia
Languages of Kyrgyzstan
Central Mongolic languages
Mongolic languages